Alessandro Magnasco  (February 4, 1667 – March 12, 1749), also known as il Lissandrino, was an Italian late-Baroque painter active mostly in Milan and Genoa. He is best known for stylized, fantastic, often phantasmagoric genre or landscape scenes.  Magnasco's distinctive style is characterized by fragmented forms rendered with swift brushstrokes and darting flashes of light.

Life
Born in Genoa to a minor artist, Stefano Magnasco, he apprenticed with Valerio Castello, and finally with Filippo Abbiati (1640–1715) in Milan. Except for 1703–09 (or 1709–11) when working in Florence for the Grand Duke Cosimo III, Magnasco labored in Milan until 1735, when he returned to his native Genoa. Magnasco often collaborated with placing figures in the landscapes of Tavella and the ruins of Clemente Spera in Milan.

Mature style

After 1710, Magnasco excelled in producing small, hypochromatic canvases with eerie and gloomy landscapes and ruins, or crowded interiors peopled with small, often lambent and cartoonishly elongated characters. The people in his paintings were often nearly liquefacted beggars dressed in tatters, rendered in flickering, nervous brushstrokes. Often they deal with unusual subjects such as synagogue services, Quaker meetings, robbers' gatherings, catastrophes, and interrogations by the Inquisition. His sentiments regarding these subjects are generally unclear.

A century later he would be described as a "romantic painter: who painted with candid touches, and ingenious expressiveness, little figures in Gothic churches; or in solitude, hermits and monks; or scoundrels assembled in town squares; soldiers in barracks". The art historian and critic Luigi Lanzi described him as the Cerquozzi of his school; thereby signaling him into the circle of followers of the Bamboccianti. He indicates that Magnasco had "figures scarcely more than a span large ... painted with humor and delight", but not as if this effect had been the intention of the painter. Lanzi says these eccentric pieces were favored by the Grand Duke Giovanni Gastone Medici of Florence. Magnasco also found contemporary patronage for his work among prominent families and collectors of Milan, for example the Arese and Casnedi families. This series of patrons underscores the fact that Magnasco was more esteemed by outsiders than by his fellow Genoese; as Lanzi noted, "his bold touch, though joined to a noble conception and to correct drawing, did not attract in Genoa, because it is far removed from the finish and union of tints which (Genoese) masters followed." In the twentieth century, Rudolf Wittkower derided him as "solitary, tense, strange, mystic, ecstatic, grotesque, and out of touch with the triumphal course of the Venetian school" from 1710 onward.

Origins of his style

The influences on his work are obscure. Some suspect the influence of the loose painterly style of his Venetian contemporary Sebastiano Ricci (1659–1734), the Genoese Domenico Piola (1627–1703) and Gregorio de Ferrari, although the most prominent of the three, Ricci, painted in a more monumental and mythic style, and these artists may in fact have been influenced by Magnasco. Magnasco was likely influenced by Milanese il Morazzone (1573–1626) in the emotional quality of his work. Some of his canvases (see ill. (q.)) recall Salvator Rosa's romantic sea-lashed landscapes, and his affinity for paintings of brigands. The diminutive scale of Magnasco's figures relative to the landscape is comparable to Claude Lorraine's more airy depictions. While his use of figures of ragged beggars has been compared with Giuseppe Maria Crespi's genre style, Crespi's figures are larger, more distinct, and individual, and it is possible that Crespi himself may have influenced Magnasco. Others point to the influences of late Baroque Italian genre painters, the Roman Bamboccianti, and in his exotic scenography, the well-disseminated engravings of the Frenchman Callot.

Legacy
Magnasco's work may have influenced Marco Ricci, Giuseppe Bazzani, Francesco Maffei, and the famed painters de tocco (by touch) Gianantonio and Francesco Guardi in Venice.

His depictions of torture in The Inquisition (or perhaps named Interrogations in a Jail) are an atypical subject for Italian baroque paintings, as were his depictions of the religious ceremonies of Jews and Quakers. Yet it remains unsolved, according to Wittkower, "how much quietism or criticism or farce went into the making of his pictures".

Selected works

Notes

References
Raffaello Soprani, Carlo Giuseppe Ratti (a cura di), Vite de Pittori, Scultori ed Architetti Genovesi; In questa seconda Edizione rivedute, accresciute ed arricchite di note da Carlo Giuseppe Ratti Tomo Primo, Stamperia Casamara, dalle Cinque Lampadi, con licenza de superiori, Genova, 1769. Pagine 155-164
Herman Voss, A Re-discovered Picture by Alessandro Magnasco, in The Burlington Magazine, LXXI, pp. 171–177. London 1937
A Loan Exhibition of Paintings by Alessandro Magnasco, exhibition catalogue, Durlacher Bros, New York
Golden Gate International Exhibition, California Palace of Fine Arts, San Francisco, 1940
Maria Pospisil, Magnasco. Firenze 1944
Benno Geiger, Magnasco. Bergamo 1949
Antonio Morassi, Mostra del Magnasco, exhibition catalogue, Bergamo 1949
Renato Roli, Alessandro Magnasco, Milano 1964
V.Magnoni, Alessandro Magnasco, Roma 1965
Alessandro Magnasco, exhibition catalogue, Louisville-Ann Arbor, 1967
Fausta Franchini Guelfi, Alessandro Magnasco. Genova 1977

Fausta Franchini Guelfi, Alessandro Magnasco. Soncino (Cr) 1991
 
L.Muti - D. De Sarno Prignano, Magnasco. Faenza 1994
Alessandro Magnasco 1667-1749. Exhibition catalogue. Milano 1996
C. Geddo, Alessandro Magnasco: una fortuna critica senza confini, ibidem, pp. 39–50
Jane Turner (a cura di), The Dictionary of Art. 20, pp. 95–96. New York, Grove, 1996.

External links

1667 births
1749 deaths
17th-century Italian painters
Italian male painters
18th-century Italian painters
Painters from Genoa
Italian vedutisti
Rococo painters
Italian Baroque painters
18th-century Italian male artists